Scutalus is a genus of air-breathing land snails, a terrestrial pulmonate gastropod mollusks in the family Bulimulidae.

Previously this genus was placed within the subfamily Bulimulinae.

Species 
Species in the genus Scutalus include:
 Scutalus baroni (Fulton, 1896)
 Scutalus broggii (Pilsbry & Olsson, 1949)
 Scutalus chango Araya & Breure, 2017
 Scutalus chiletensis Weyrauch, 1967
 Scutalus coraeformis (Pilsbry, 1897)
 Scutalus cousini (Jousseaume, 1887)
 Scutalus cretaceus (Pfeiffer, 1855) - images
 Scutalus grandiventris Weyrauch, 1960
 Scutalus latecolumellaris (Preston, 1909)
 Scutalus macedoi Weyrauch, 1967
 Scutalus mariopenai Breure & Mogollón Avilla, 2010
 Scutalus mutabilis (W.J. Broderip, 1832) (synonym: Bulinus mutabilis Broderip, 1832)
 Scutalus nivalis (d'Orbigny, 1835)
 Scutalus omissus Weyrauch, 1967
 Scutalus ortizpuentei Weyrauch, 1967
 Scutalus phaeocheilus (Haas, 1955)
 Scutalus pilosus Weyrauch, 1967
 Scutalus prometheus (J.C.H. Crosse, 1869) (synonym: Bulimus prometheus J.C.H. Crosse, 1869)
 Scutalus proteiformis (Dohrn, 1863)
 Scutalus proteus (W.J. Broderip, 1832) (synonym: Bulinus proteus Broderip, 1832) 
 Scutalus quechuarum (Crawford, 1939)
 Scutalus sanborni (Haas, 1947)
 Scutalus sordidus (Deshayes, 1838)
 Scutalus steerei (Pilsbry, 1900)
 Scutalus versicolor (Broderip, 1832)
Species brought into synonymy
 Scutalus pluto (J.C.H. Crosse, 1869) (synonym: Bulimus pluto Crosse, 1869): synonym of Bocourtia pluto (Crosse, 1869)
 Scutalus revinctus (Hupé, 1857): synonym of Bulimus revinctus Hupé, 1857
 Scutalus tupacii (d'Orbigny, 1835): synonym of Bocourtia tupacii (d'Orbigny, 1835)
 Scutalus weddellii (Hupé, 1857) (synonym: Bulimus weddellii Hupé, 1857): synonym of Bocourtia weddellii (Hupé, 1857)

References

External links 
 

Bulimulidae